Mesciniadia infractalis is a species of snout moth in the genus Mesciniadia. It was described by Francis Walker in 1864. It is found in Australia.

References

Moths described in 1964
Phycitini